Stoneyford may refer to:
Stoneyford, County Antrim, Northern Ireland
Stoneyford, County Kilkenny, Ireland
Stoneyford, Derbyshire, England
Stoneyford, Devon, England

See also
Stonyford, California, United States, a census-designated place